Imperator is a title used in the Roman Republic.

Imperator may also refer to:
Imperator (ship), a German ocean liner
Imperator (fungus), a genus of bolete mushroom
Boa constrictor imperator, a subspecies of boa constrictor
Pavo muticus imperator (Imperator, Indo-Chinese green peafowl, or dragonbird), a subspecies of the endangered green peafowl
a title used in occult societies, such as AMORC, Confraternity of the Rose Cross, or FUDOSI
a title used in Saga of the Skolian Empire by science fiction author Catherine Asaro
Imperator Titan, a war machine in the fictional universe of Warhammer 40,000
Ave Imperator, a proclamation of loyalty to the Immortal God-Emperor of Mankind in Warhammer 40,000
Imperator: Rome, a video game by Paradox Development Studio
 Imperator (horse)